Bogason is a surname. Notable people with the surname include:

Eggert Bogason (born 1960), Icelandic athlete
Tróndur Bogason (born 1976), Faroese composer and musician